Kang Ding or Kangding may refer to:

Kang Ding or Geng Ding (reigned  1170–1147 BC), king of the Shang dynasty
Kangding (1040–1041), reign period of Emperor Renzong of Song
ROCS Kang Ding, a frigate of the Republic of China Navy
Kangding, a city in Garzê Tibetan Autonomous Prefecture, Sichuan, China